Spiritual Discourses (also known as Spiritual Sayings or Spiritual Freedom) is a book of fifteen lectures delivered by Morteza Motahhari. The common aspect of all of these lectures is their reflection on self-improvement and self-cultivation, though they also address social issues at some points.

Background
Most of the lectures were delivered in Hosseiniyeh Ershad between 1968 and 1971 in Iran, Tehran. Their subject matter concerns spiritual issues around self-construction and self-cultivation. Morteza Motahhari references philosophical anthropology to explain and explore these concepts.

The first edition of Spiritual Discourses was published in 1986, consisting of thirteen lectures across eight chapters in Iran. In the nineteenth edition, two lectures were added to the second chapter. The Persian title of the book, was renamed to Spiritual Freedom after several editions by the publisher. It has been reprinted more than 80 times in Iran.

Chapters
The book has eight chapters:

Spiritual Freedom – two lectures delivered in 1969 in Hosseiniyeh Ershad, Tehran.
Worship and Prayer – four lectures delivered in 1970 in Hosseiniyeh Ershad, Tehran.
Repentance – two lectures delivered in 1970 in Hosseiniyeh Ershad, Tehran.
Migration and Jihad – three lectures delivered in 1971 in Naarmak Mosque, Tehran.
Nobility and Magnanimity of Spirit – a lecture delivered on November 8, 1970, in Hosseiniyeh Ershad, Tehran.
Belief in the Unseen – a lecture delivered in November 1968 in a private home.
The Criteria for Humanity – a university lecture.
The School of Humanity – a lecture delivered at the College of Engineering, University of Tehran.

Reception
In a meeting with a group of poets on August 15, 2011, Ali Khamenei, Supreme Leader of Iran, recommended the book after pointing out the usefulness of reading the Quran, Nahj al-Balagha and Al-Sahifa al-Sajjadiyya.

Translations
The book was originally published in Persian, and has been translated into English, Urdu, Spanish and Arabic.

See also
 The Principles of Philosophy and the Method of Realism
 Sexual Ethics in Islam and in the Western World
 Understanding Islamic Sciences
 Anecdotes of pious men
 Atlas of Shia
 Hadiqat al Haqiqa
 Reflection on the Ashura movement
 Step by Step Up to Union With God

References

1986 books
Iranian books
Books by Morteza Motahhari